Maminydjama Maymuru (born 1997), known as Magnolia Maymuru, is an Aboriginal Australian actress and model who won Best Supporting Actress at the 9th AACTA awards, for her portrayal in The Nightingale. She was born in Yirrkala in the Northern Territory of Australia and belongs to the Yolngu community.

In 2014, as a teenager, she was spotted by a model scout while withdrawing money from an ATM. First, she turned down the offer as she was continuing her education. She agreed to take part in a fashion show and to enter fashion industry, as she met Mehali Tsangaris, director of NT Fashion Week, while she was shopping. As a model, she used her registered middle name, Magnolia. At the age of 19, Maminydjama Magnolia Maymuru became the first Aboriginal woman from the Northern Territory to enter the Miss World Australia beauty pageant and reached the national finals.

References 

Living people
1997 births
Australian female models
Indigenous Australian actresses
People from the Northern Territory
Yolngu people